Mary H. Glenski (born August 31, 1930) is a former Democratic member of the South Dakota House of Representatives, representing District 15 from 2001 to 2008. She did not run in 2008 because she had reached the term limits for South Dakota.

References
South Dakota Legislature - Mary Glenski

External links
Project Vote Smart - Representative Mary H. Glenski (SD) profile
2006 2004 2002 2000 campaign contributions

Democratic Party members of the South Dakota House of Representatives
1930 births
Living people
Women state legislators in South Dakota
21st-century American politicians
21st-century American women politicians
Politicians from Sioux Falls, South Dakota
Politicians from Denver
Benedictine College alumni
South Dakota State University alumni